The Pretender is the 23rd book in the Animorphs series, written by K.A. Applegate, first published in November 1998. The book is narrated by Tobias.

Plot summary
A drought has ravaged the part of the forest which Tobias, an effectively orphaned human boy trapped in the body of a red-tailed hawk, calls home. Another red-tailed hawk has moved into his territory. Tobias attempts to kill a baby rabbit for food but is outmaneuvered by his rival and suffers an injury from the mother rabbit. In desperation, Tobias finds and eats a piece of roadkill, but to his embarrassment, Rachel finds him while doing so.

A couple of days later Jake sends Tobias to speak with Rachel. Rachel lets Tobias know that someone claiming to be his cousin, Aria, has contacted a lawyer of his father and wants to get in touch with him. Rachel learned this information second-hand from Mr. Chapman, their high school vice principal and a high ranking Yeerk Controller. The Animorphs suspect it is a trap but decide to move forward with Tobias meeting with the lawyer, DeGroot.

At the meeting Tobias learns that his father had left a last will and testament to be read to him on his next birthday. DeGroot was also contacted by Aria, a photographer who recently returned from assignment in Africa and is staying at the downtown Hyatt. Concerned for his wellbeing she invited Tobias to meet with her.

Tobias flies off on his own and decides to go to the freed Hork-Bajir colony, where he meets with Jara Hamee, Ket Halpak, and their daughter, the colony's anomalously-gifted “seer” Toby Hamee. They tell Tobias that one of their male children, Bek, is missing. They fear he may have gone to a nearby Yeerk pool and factory, which they have raided previously to save captured Hork-Bajir.

Jake sends Tobias and Rachel to find Aria at the hotel. In bird morph they chase her cab to Frank's Safari Land, a run-down mini zoo and putt-putt golf course near the airport. Inside they find that Frank had purchased Bek from a truck driver and caged him. Neither Frank nor Aria seems to recognize that Bek is a Hork-Bajir. Frank refuses to let Aria take photos of Bek. Instead, Aria expresses concern for Bek and the deplorable conditions at Frank's zoo. She leaves and gets into a black limousine.

The Animorphs decide to extract Bek. At the zoo, Rachel morphs elephant and Tobias morphs Hork-Bajir. Rachel crashes into the building and Tobias finds Bek being guarded by human Controllers. A chaotic fight breaks out. During the fray Bek is freed but Tobias is shot. Jake orders him to leave with Bek. As they head for the back, the two are stopped by Visser Three, who morphs into a kaftid: an acid-spewing eight-legged alien. Tobias manages to slow down Visser Three but takes an acid attack directly to his back while trying to protect Bek. Tobias plunges into the lagoon to wash off the acid but loses Bek. The Animorphs abandon the mission.

The next day Ax visits Tobias and suggests they find Aria. While following her, they witness her save a small child who is almost hit by a car. Tobias and Ax conclude that Aria must be a human, not a Controller. That night Tobias visits Rachel. She tells him that Jake wants to infiltrate the Yeerk's Hork-Bajir facility to try and save Bek. When Tobias brings up Aria, the two argue about Tobias becoming human again permanently so he could live a human life. As Tobias, in anger, prepares to leave, Rachel reminds him that tomorrow is his birthday and he will have to decide between being hawk or human.

The next morning Jake and the others speak with Toby and ask her for the location of the Hork-Bajir facility. Toby insists that a small group of ten Hork-Bajir go with them for the battle. Jake reluctantly agrees. Secretly, Tobias seriously considers morphing and remaining human after the battle.

The Animorphs and the Hork-Bajir army reach the facility. They decide to allow four Hork-Bajir to get caught and to hide on their bodies as various insects. The Hork-Bajir are locked in a cage, where they are reunited with Bek. Tobias morphs Hork-Bajir and tricks a Hork-Bajir Controller into giving him the key to the cage. A fight breaks out and the Animorphs morph their battle animals. Tobias takes to the sky, where he sees a helicopter approaching the battle. In the cockpit he finds Aria piloting the helicopter and realizes that Aria is not only a Controller but Visser Three in morph. Tobias collapses but is rescued by Toby and Rachel.

Even knowing it is a trap, Tobias attends the meeting with DeGroot (whom Tobias now knows is a Controller) and Aria/Visser Three. Tobias learns that his father is Elfangor, who left a frank and detailed message for Tobias. Tobias effectively convinces Visser Three and DeGroot that he does not believe Elfangor's message and leaves the office. However, Tobias realizes that his duty is to be both boy and hawk. He returns to the meadow and acquires the mother rabbit before eating it. He then shepherds its babies to a safer spot. That night he visits Rachel, who has a birthday cake waiting for him.

Morphs

Contributions to the series' story arc
Aria/Tobias's “cousin” is revealed to be Visser Three in morph/disguise
Tobias learns his “adoptive” father is not his real father. He learns his real, biological father is Elfangor
Tobias and the Animorphs learn the Hork-Bajir are freeing their brethren to increase their numbers so they can fight the Yeerks, but also so they have a fighting chance against humans once the war ends. Tobias realizes that Toby is using forward thinking to prioritize the preservation of her species, who were abandoned and doomed by the Andalites on their home planet, as told in the Hork-Bajir Chronicles.
Tobias meets Fal Tagut, a now freed Hork-Bajir whom Tobias fought at the Yeerk pool and injured its left eye. Fal Tagut forgives Tobias for his actions and is grateful for its freedom.

References 

Animorphs books
1998 American novels
1998 science fiction novels